A prevertebral plexus is a nerve plexus which branches from a prevertebral ganglion.

References

External links
 http://www.dartmouth.edu/~humananatomy/part_5/chapter_30.html

Nerve plexus